Marcela Lombardo Otero (20 March 1926 – 5 March 2018) was a Mexican politician, daughter of the leftist Vicente Lombardo Toledano, founder of the Popular Socialist Party. She was a deputy during the L and LIV Legislatures, from 1976 to 1979 and 1988 to 1991. In the 1988 election, she was the only female candidate from any of the parties that formed the FDN (National Democratic Front, the left wing coalition) to win her seat in congress by majority.

Career 

She was the presidential candidate of PPS (Popular Socialist Party) in the 1994 election, in which  she obtained 0.47% of the votes. This result (second to last among nine presidential candidates) implied the loss of the official registry to her party, which was recovered in 1997, and then lost again definitely.

She was the Director of Centro de Estudios Filosóficos, Políticos y Sociales Vicente Lombardo Toledano.

References 

1926 births
2018 deaths
Women members of the Chamber of Deputies (Mexico)
Candidates in the 1994 Mexican presidential election
Members of the Chamber of Deputies (Mexico)
Mexican people of Italian descent
Popular Socialist Party (Mexico) politicians
20th-century Mexican politicians
20th-century Mexican women politicians
National Autonomous University of Mexico alumni
Politicians from Mexico City
Deputies of the L Legislature of Mexico
Deputies of the LIV Legislature of Mexico